Ross Tipon is a freelance author based in Baguio, Philippines, who formerly wrote a column for a now-defunct daily publication in Manila called Philippines Newsday.

His later works are mainly political in nature, being a critic of government corruption in the Philippines and an advocate of Philippine recolonization by the United States.

In July 2005, Tipon published a book entitled The Power and the Glory: The Cult of Manalo, which is critical of the Iglesia ni Cristo, a politically influential Philippine-based Christian denomination. The INC promptly filed a lawsuit claiming that the book was defamatory of its organization. The INC further claimed that the publication of Tipon's book will cause social unrest. For his part Tipon accused the INC of suppressing his rights to free speech.

The Power and the Glory: The Cult of Manalo catalogued what he believed to be the INC's un-biblical doctrines. Critics of the INC believe members of the INC and the public should be free to study educated criticisms directed at any doctrine of any religious group in the spirit of the free speech and religious freedom.

The eventual publication of The Power and the Glory: The Cult of Manalo has effectively challenged the limits of the INC's perceived influence among political leaders in the Philippines.

External links 
 Article about Ross Tipon Work

Year of birth missing (living people)
Living people
Filipino journalists
People from Baguio